The 2023 Vancouver FC season is the first season in the history of Vancouver FC. In addition to the Canadian Premier League, the club will compete in the Canadian Championship.

Current squad 
As of March 10, 2023

Transfers

In

Loans in

Draft picks 
Vancouver FC selected the following players in the 2023 CPL–U Sports Draft. Draft picks are not automatically signed to the team roster. Only those who are signed to a contract will be listed as transfers in.

Competitions
Matches are listed in Langley local time: Pacific Daylight Time (UTC−7)

Pre-season friendlies

Overview

Canadian Premier League

Table

Results by match

Matches

Canadian Championship

References

External links 
Official site

2023 Canadian Premier League
Canadian soccer clubs 2023 season
Vancouver FC